Newellton is a community on Cape Sable Island in the Municipality of the District of Barrington of Shelburne County, Nova Scotia, Canada.

See also
 List of communities in Nova Scotia

References

External links
Newellton on Destination Nova Scotia

Communities in Shelburne County, Nova Scotia
General Service Areas in Nova Scotia
Populated coastal places in Canada